The FAW Vita (天津一汽-威志) or FAW Weizhi is a subcompact sedan and hatchback produced by FAW Group under the FAW Tianjin brand from July 2006 to 2011.

Overview

The FAW Vita is powered by the 5A-FE and 8A-FE engines from Toyota, which is a 1.5 liter 4-cylinder engine producing 75kw and 130 nm of torque. Transmission options for the Vita includes a 5-speed manual or 5-speed automatic. Price of the FAW Vita starts at 53,800 yuan and ends at 68,800 yuan.

A cross version called the FAW Vita V2 Cross was planned as well as of 2011, but the car was never produced, and the FAW-Tianjin brand was soon discontinued.

FAW Vita V5

The FAW Weizhi C1 or Vita C1 (CA 7130 /CA 7140) name was also used in some markets, and after the discontinuation of the Vita hatchback in 2011, a facelift for the sedan version named the FAW Vita V5 (CA 7150 BUE) was sold from 2012 to 2015.

References 

FAW Group vehicles
Cars introduced in 2006
Front-wheel-drive vehicles
Hatchbacks
Subcompact cars
Cars of China